Pierre et Marie Curie is a station on the southeast branch of Line 7 of the Paris Métro. The station, located in Ivry-sur-Seine, was opened in 1946.

It was previously known as Pierre Curie. Following a renovation completed on 31 January 2007, it was renamed to honour his wife and fellow Nobel laureate Maria Skłodowska-Curie as well on 8 March, International Women's Day. It thereby became only the third station in the Métro named for a woman that is not a saint, after Marguerite de Rochechouart and Louise Michel.

Station layout

Gallery

References 
Roland, Gérard (2003). Stations de métro. D’Abbesses à Wagram. Éditions Bonneton.

Paris Métro stations in Ivry-sur-Seine
Railway stations in France opened in 1946